Luka Wraber (born 7 September 1990) is an Austrian badminton player, affiliated with the ASKÖ Neudörfl club. He started playing badminton at aged 8, and joined the Austrian national badminton team in 2008. He competed at the 2015 and 2019 European Games, and also at the 2020 Summer Olympics.

Achievements

BWF International Challenge/Series (6 titles, 11 runners-up) 
Men's singles

Men's doubles

  BWF International Challenge tournament
  BWF International Series tournament
  BWF Future Series tournament

References

External links 
 

Living people
1990 births
Austrian male badminton players
Badminton players at the 2020 Summer Olympics
Olympic badminton players of Austria
Badminton players at the 2015 European Games
Badminton players at the 2019 European Games
European Games competitors for Austria
21st-century Austrian people